Orangefield is an unincorporated community located in Orange County, Texas, in the Beaumont-Port Arthur metropolitan area, about twelve miles east of Beaumont in Orange County, Texas, United States. (The latitude of Orangefield is 30.074N. The longitude is -93.855W). In 1913, the town began to develop around the oilfield just west of Orange, and its name was derived from being called the "Orange Oil Field" which was later shorted to "Orangefield". After a major producing well was discovered in August 1913, a post office was established for Orangefield in 1922.

It was a small community of farmers before the discovery of oil.  A few rice farms and marshes were what lived in the area between Orange, Bridge City, and Vidor.  The rice crop planted in the area was linked to W.R. Hill possibly as early as 1888.  Immigrant farmers made up much of the population in the area that was divided into three different communities.  The communities fell under the names Oilla, Terry, and Duncan's Woods. It's not really known when the name Orangefied actually formed, but it was sometime after the first oil well struck.

Many farmers allowed oil wells to be dug on their properties, especially since they still owned the mineral rights. The Bland oil well was the first to strike oil in 1913.  It received the name "Old Faithful," because it was said to "head like Old Faithful every 50 minutes."  Wildcatters from all over raced to the area after the news of the Bland well.  The discovery of oil in Orange County raised a lot of hopes. These hopes began to dwindle during the ten years until the true boom commenced.

Much of the town's business district was destroyed in a fire that burned down 13 buildings in the business district after starting in a tailor shop.  Reportedly, a steam press for clothes caught fire and "an employee picked up a bucket of gasoline, believing it to be water" and threw it on the blaze. 

By 1927 the boom seemed to be over.

A second boom in 1937 revived the little town and breathed new life into the dying community. A. H. Montagne and Paul Cormier brought in the new boom when they hit a nice major oil pocket. Montagne was quoted as saying about Cormier, "The man just found a deeper well. He gambled and hit." The population once again shot through the roof during this second boom . The depression was eased on a lot of people living in Orangefield because of this second boom. Work was readily available in the oilfields for those who were willing. There were not many that would not be willing to work in the oilfields during that time. Farmers whose crops failed would change profession to save their families and farms. The boom only lasted a few years until World War II would cause it to have a premature end.

The population reached an estimated 1000 people by the mid-1930s, but decreased to about 500 by the early 1950s. In 1990, the estimated population was 725.

The Orangefield Independent School District serves area students.

It is in the Central Standard time zone. Elevation is 10 feet.

Notable residents

 Jeff Granger - Former Texas A&M University quarterback and pitcher (All SWC and All American) (1991-1993); Former MLB pitcher for Royals and Pirates (fifth overall pick in 1993 MLB Draft)
 Bradley Dale Peveto Assistant football coach at Texas A&M University.
 Michael Berry (radio host) three-term Houston city councilman and now a conservative talk show host on KTRH radio and KPRC radio, both based in Houston, Texas.

References

External links
Orange County government's website

Unincorporated communities in Orange County, Texas
Unincorporated communities in Texas
Beaumont–Port Arthur metropolitan area